Francisco Comesaña (born 6 October 2000) is an Argentine tennis player.

Comesaña has a career high ATP singles ranking of 204 achieved on 25 July 2022. He also has a career high doubles ranking of 350 achieved on 20 June 2022.

Comesaña has won his first ATP Challenger titles in 2022, two singles titles in Argentine and one doubles in Italy with Luciano Darderi.

Challenger and ITF World Tennis Tour finals

Singles 11 (5–6)

Doubles (1)

References

External links
 
 

2000 births
Living people
Argentine male tennis players
Sportspeople from Mar del Plata
21st-century Argentine people